Pumahuaín (possibly from Quechua puma cougar, puma, Ancash Quechua wayi house, "cougar house", -n a suffix) is a  mountain in the southern part of the Cordillera Blanca in the Andes of Peru. It is situated in the Ancash Region, Recuay Province, Catac District. Puma Wayin lies southwest of Mururahu and Kunkush and northwest of Pukarahu.

Sources 

Mountains of Peru
Mountains of Ancash Region